Jefferson Historic District is a national historic district located at Lafayette, Tippecanoe County, Indiana.  The district encompasses 161 contributing buildings, 2 contributing sites, and 22 contributing structures in a predominantly residential section of Lafayette.  It developed between about 1853 and 1951 and includes representative examples of Italianate, Greek Revival, and Bungalow / American Craftsman style architecture. Notable contributing resources include the Deutsche Evangelische Kirche (1905), Isador Metzger House (c. 1866), Hubert Gilmartin House (c. 1868), B.F. Biggs Pump Factory Building (1872, 1885–1894), Deutsche Methodist Kirche (1885), Herman & Mary Fletemeyer House (c. 1897), Mohr House (c. 1865), Warrenberg-Reule Double House (c. 1878), Alfred Gaddis House (c. 1865), Wabash Valley House (1862), Haywood Tag Company Building (1928), and Jefferson High School (1927).

It was listed on the National Register of Historic Places in 2001.

See also
Centennial Neighborhood District
Downtown Lafayette Historic District
Ellsworth Historic District
Highland Park Neighborhood Historic District
Ninth Street Hill Historic District
Park Mary Historic District
Perrin Historic District
St. Mary Historic District
Upper Main Street Historic District

References

Historic districts on the National Register of Historic Places in Indiana
Italianate architecture in Indiana
Greek Revival architecture in Indiana
Neighborhoods in Lafayette, Indiana
Historic districts in Lafayette, Indiana
National Register of Historic Places in Tippecanoe County, Indiana